"No Mercy" is a song written by Todd Cerney, Dennis Morgan and Stephen Allen Davis, and recorded by American country music artist Ty Herndon. It was released in January 2000 as the second single from his album Steam.

Critical reception
Deborah Evans Price of Billboard reviewed the single favorably, saying that the song was "equally sensuous" to "Steam". She added that Herndon "sounds cool and controlled with his fine vocal".

Chart performance

References

2000 singles
Ty Herndon songs
Songs written by Todd Cerney
Songs written by Stephen Allen Davis
Songs written by Dennis Morgan (songwriter)
Epic Records singles
1999 songs